Hotel Castelar was a hotel located at the northwest intersection of May and the 9 de Julio Avenues, in the downtown Montserrat section of Buenos Aires, Argentina. It operated from 90 years, closing in 2020 as a result of the coronavirus pandemic.

Opened in 1928 as the Hotel Excelsior, the building was designed by Italian architect Mario Palanti and built by local engineer José Pinzone.  The Spanish poet and dramatist, Federico García Lorca, stayed here from October 1933 to March 1934 while his play, Bodas de Sangre, was being performed at the Avenida Theatre nearby; his erstwhile room has been preserved as a museum. More recently, the hotel was the site of Vice President Carlos Álvarez's dramatic, October 6, 2000, resignation, a milestone helping lead to President Fernando de la Rúa's own departure a year later.

The Hotel in film
Many movies were filmed inside the hotel.

 1986 Poor Butterfly
 1988 Peculiar Attraction
 1999 Claim, with Billy Zane
 2001 Gallito Ciego with Rodrigo de la Serna

External links
 Hotel Castelar

References

Hotels in Buenos Aires
Tourist attractions in Buenos Aires
Hotel buildings completed in 1928
Museums in Buenos Aires
Literary museums in Argentina
Biographical museums in Argentina
1928 establishments in Argentina
2020 disestablishments in Argentina